Wayde Shannon Smith (born 19 April 1954) is a former Australian politician.

Born in Western Australia, he served on Wanneroo City Council from 1990 to 1993. In 1993 he was elected to the Western Australian Legislative Assembly as the Liberal member for Wanneroo. He lost preselection for the 1996 election as he was drawn into controversy surrounding the operation of Wanneroo City Council; he was convicted of perjury in November 1997 and sentenced to 18 months imprisonment. He was released on 30 April 1998.

Smith appealed against his conviction in the Supreme Court of Western Australia, Court of Criminal Appeal, however the appeal was rejected by the court.

References

1954 births
Living people
Members of the Western Australian Legislative Assembly
Liberal Party of Australia members of the Parliament of Western Australia
Australian politicians convicted of crimes